Diego de Simancas or Diego de Simancas Simancas (died 1583) was a Roman Catholic prelate who served as Bishop of Zamora (1578–1583), Bishop of Badajoz (1568–1578), and Bishop of Ciudad Rodrigo (1564–1568).

Biography
Diego de Simancas was born in Spain, the son of Diego de Simancas Bretón and María de Simancas and the brother of Juan de Simancas Simancas, Bishop of Cartagena.
On 15 December 1564, he was appointed during the papacy of Pope Pius IV as Bishop of Ciudad Rodrigo.
On 1 April 1565, he was consecrated bishop.
On 3 December 1568, he was appointed during the papacy of Pope Pius V as Bishop of Badajoz.
On 13 June 1578, he was appointed during the papacy of Pope Gregory XIII as Bishop of Zamora.
He served as Bishop of Zamora until his death on 16 October 1583.

Episcopal succession
While bishop, he was the principal co-consecrator of:
Antonio Rodríguez de Pazos y Figueroa, Bishop of Patti (1568);
Francisco Trujillo García, Bishop of León (1578);
Lorenzo Figueroa Córdoba, Bishop of Sigüenza (1579); and
Jerónimo Manrique de Lara, Bishop of Salamanca (1579).

See also
Catholic Church in Spain

References

External links and additional sources
 (for Chronology of Bishops) 
 (for Chronology of Bishops) 
 (for Chronology of Bishops) 
 (for Chronology of Bishops) 
 (for Chronology of Bishops) 
 (for Chronology of Bishops) 

16th-century Roman Catholic bishops in Spain
Bishops appointed by Pope Pius IV
Bishops appointed by Pope Pius V
Bishops appointed by Pope Gregory XIII
1583 deaths